Acorus gramineus, commonly known as Japanese sweet flag, Japanese rush, grassy-leaved sweet flag, and grass-leaf sweet flag, is a botanical species belonging to the genus Acorus, native to Japan, Korea, and eastern Asia. The plant usually grows in wetlands and shallow water.

Description
This shrubby plant's long, narrow, slightly curved leaves may grow to 30 cm (12 inches) in height. It can grow fully or partially submerged, or in very moist soil, but it will usually only flower when at least partially submerged.

Var. pusillus has slightly shorter, more rigid glossy green leaves, while var. variegatus has longer leaves streaked with yellow.

Cultivation and uses
Acorus gramineus spreads aggressively by rhizome, creating a nearly-seamless groundcover where conditions are favorable, and it is frequently used around the edges of ponds and water gardens, as well as submerged in freshwater aquaria. It can be propagated by dividing the fleshy underwater rhizome and planting the base in shallow water.

In Japan during the Heian period, leaves of the plant were gathered for the Sweet Flag Festival on the fifth day of the fifth month. Sweet flag and wormwood were spread on the roofs of houses for decoration and to ward off evil spirits. Special herbal balls made of sweet flag were also fashioned for the occasion.

Notes

References

Acorales
Freshwater plants
Medicinal plants of Asia
Plants used in traditional Chinese medicine